Messinger is a surname of Germanic origin. Notable people with the name include:
Alida Rockefeller Messinger (born 1948), American philanthropist; daughter of John D. Rockefeller III
Dominic Messinger (contemporary), American composer of soap-opera music
Evelyn Messinger (contemporary), American journalist  and media activist
Gertrude Messinger (1911–95), American actress 1930s–1950s
Jonathan Messinger (contemporary), American author and editor
Ruth Messinger (born 1940), American politician from New York City; unsuccessful candidate for Mayor of New York 1997
Rama Messinger, Israeli actress and singer